20 Jazz Funk Greats is the third studio album by British industrial music group Throbbing Gristle, released in December 1979 by the band's label Industrial Records. It is known for its tongue-in-cheek title and artwork, and has been hailed as the band's best work, with UK magazine Fact naming it the best album of the 1970s, and Pitchfork naming it the best industrial album of all time.

Recording 
20 Jazz Funk Greats is the band's first full studio album, as prior albums contained both live and studio recordings. The production is credited to "Sinclair/Brooks". The album was recorded on a 16-track borrowed from Paul McCartney after Peter Christopherson had worked on artwork for McCartney. The album was produced using electronic musical instruments and effects units, primarily from Roland and Boss.

Artwork and title 
The album's cover photograph was taken at Beachy Head, a chalk headland on the south coast of England known as one of the world's most notorious suicide spots. In a 2012 interview, Cosey explained the album cover and tongue-in-cheek title:

We did the cover so it was a pastiche of something you would find in a Woolworth's bargain bin. We took the photograph at the most famous suicide spot in England, called Beachy Head. So, the picture is not what it seems, it is not so nicey nicey at all, and neither is the music once you take it home and buy it. We had this idea in mind that someone quite innocently would come along to a record store and see [the record] and think they would be getting 20 really good jazz/funk greats, and then they would put it on at home and they would just get decimated.

The 1981 issue of the album released on Fetish Records featured an alternate version of the cover art in which an apparently dead and naked male body is seen lying in front of the band. In 2013, Radiohead graphic designer Stanley Donwood selected the artwork as his favourite album cover.

Critical reception 

Reviewing the album for Pitchfork, Drew Daniel praised 20 Jazz Funk Greats as Throbbing Gristle's peak, writing that "it's in the pathos of their promiscuous liaisons with the forbidden territory of various forms of 'real music' that this album generates a weirdly gripping power of its own." He continued, "20 Jazz Funk Greats finds the band waking up from D.O.A's dark night of the soul and feeling curiously frisky. Snacking on not only the titular funk and jazz, the band also takes touristic zig zags through exotica, rock and disco", ultimately describing it as a "kitsch detour toward mutant disco". AllMusic writer Paul Simpson wrote, "Thoroughly exciting and immeasurably influential, 20 Jazz Funk Greats is easily Throbbing Gristle's crowning achievement, and one of the highlights of the post-punk era." In a retrospective review of Throbbing Gristle's discography for Uncut, Michael Bonner stated that "Musically, it turned away from the precipice; not exactly jazz and funk, but sublimating TG’s noise elements within electronic rhythms and proto-exotica. Album highlight "Hot on the Heels of Love" is convincingly Moroder-esque disco, Cosey breathing sweet nothings amid bubbling synthesisers and whip-crack snare. Elsewhere, P-Orridge mines a lyrical seam of control and domination." Dusted Magazine described the album as "a deliberate attempt to toy with the ideas behind marketing strategy and the purpose of musical genres."

Pitchfork ranked 20 Jazz Funk Greats at number 91 on its list of the 100 greatest albums of the 1970s. UK magazine Fact named it the best album of the 1970s, writing that "This album is a rupture. It's an open crack into the unpronounceable dimensions into which tumble important streams of 20th-century pop, art and underground culture, to seethe around each other, mingling, festering, sprouting new and unpredictable forms which in turn would ooze out to infest vast sections of what comes after."

In June 2019, Pitchfork named 20 Jazz Funk Greats as the best industrial album of all time.

Track listing

Personnel 
 Genesis P-Orridge – vocals, bass guitar, violin, vibraphone, synthesizer
 Cosey Fanni Tutti – guitar, synthesizer, cornet, vocals
 Chris Carter – synthesizer, album sequencing, drum programming, vocals
 Peter Christopherson – tape, vibraphone, cornet, vocals

 Technical

 Sinclair/Brooks – production

Equipment 
Roland equipment used on the album included a SRE-555 Chorus Echo effects unit, SH-7 Synth, CSQ 100 music sequencer, CR-78 CompuRhythm drum machine, System-100M (M-191J) modular synthesizer rack and 100M M-181 electronic keyboard. Boss equipment included a PH-1 phaser effects pedal, DR-55 Dr. Rhythm drum machine, KM-4 mixer, CE-2 Chorus pedal and BF-2 Flanger. Other equipment included a Simmons ClapTrap, Auratone 5C speakers, JVC amplifier, TEAC cassette deck, Seck 6-2 audio mixer and Casio M10 keyboard.

Charts

References

Sources

Further reading

External links 
 

1979 albums
Throbbing Gristle albums
Industrial Records albums
Albums with cover art by Hipgnosis
Experimental pop albums